Televisit is an Australian television series which aired on Perth station TVW-7 from 1960 to 1965. It was a daytime series for women. It was among the first series produced by the station, and is significant as one of the first series produced in Western Australia. The original presenters included David Farr and Joan Wilson.

References

External links
Televisit on IMDb

1960 Australian television series debuts
1965 Australian television series endings
Black-and-white Australian television shows
English-language television shows